Michael or Mike Cross may refer to:

 Michael Cross (1942–2022), British Royal Air Force officer
 Michael Cross (painter) (fl. 1633–1660), Anglo-Spanish painter and copyist
 Mike Cross (musician) (born 1946), American singer-songwriter and musician
 Mike Cross (politician) (1944–2013), American businessman and politician in Louisiana
 Mike Cross, American guitarist with Sponge